Thornton Watlass Hall is a large Grade I listed Georgian country house in Thornton Watlass, North Yorkshire, England, some  north of Masham.

It is constructed of stone with an 18th-century gabled two-storey main block and 16th century wings at each end. A long stable wing is attached.

History
The estate had descended in the Thoresby family until the heiress Agnes Thoresby married Thomas Dodsworth in 1415. The original house was substantially rebuilt in 1723–27. The west wing was added in 1780 and the east wing in 1800.

By the mid-1700s the house and estate had descended in the Dodsworth family to Henrietta, daughter of John Dodsworth and sister and heiress of Frederick Dodsworth, who married John Silvester Smith of Newland Park, Drax. John Silvester was created a Baronet in 1784. His son, the 2nd Baronet, adopted the name Dodsworth in 1821 and the 4th Baronet later assumed the family name of Smith-Dodsworth. Sir David John Smith-Dodsworth, the 9th Baronet, now occupies the house.

The Hall has been featured over the years on several television dramas, including All Creatures Great and Small (BBC), Wuthering Heights (ITV) and Heartbeat (ITV) where it has featured as Ashfordly Hall and Websters Hotel for the past nine years.

See also
 Smith-Dodsworth baronets

References

External links
 Official website

Grade I listed buildings in North Yorkshire
Country houses in North Yorkshire
Wensleydale